Rawi or al-Rawi may refer to:

a rāwī, a reciter and transmitter of Arabic poetry
a person from Rawa, Iraq
Ar-Rawi (magazine)
Al-Rawi (television series)